Manor is a village in the Canadian province of Saskatchewan within the RM of Moose Mountain No. 63 and Census Division No. 1. The Manor Museum (1904) is designated a Municipal Heritage Property under the provincial Heritage Property Act.

History 
Manor incorporated as a village on 15 April 1902.

Demographics 

See also 
 Cannington Manor Provincial Park
 List of communities in Saskatchewan
 List of villages in Saskatchewan

References

External links

Villages in Saskatchewan
Moose Mountain No. 63, Saskatchewan
Division No. 1, Saskatchewan